An advanced stop line (ASL), also called advanced stop box or bike box, is a type of road marking at signalised road junctions allowing certain types of vehicle a head start when the traffic signal changes from red to green. Advanced stop lines are implemented widely in Denmark, the United Kingdom, and other European countries but the idea was first conceptualized by transportation planner Michael Lynch for the city of Portland, Oregon, in response to numerous bike crashes at intersections.

Description
Most commonly associated with bicycles, they may also be provided for buses and motorcycles.  There are two parallel stop lines at the intersection, the first one at which all traffic except that for which the facility is provided must stop, and a second one nearer the intersection to which only specified vehicles may proceed. If the signals change to red when a vehicle is crossing the first line, the driver must stop at the second line   The area between the stop lines is the "reservoir" or "box".  Signage may be required to inform road users as to the meaning of the extra stop line.  A separate set of traffic signals may be provided for the specified traffic, but all vehicles usually use the same signals.

Cyclists

ASLs for cyclists are generally used in conjunction with some form of cycle lane for filtering cycle traffic. This arrangement theoretically allows cyclists to play to their strengths by regularising the practice of filtering to the top of queuing traffic during the red phase at traffic lights.  Cyclists turning to the offside (i.e. right in the UK and Ireland, left in USA etc.) are able to take up a proper turning position.  Straight-on cyclists can adopt and maintain a prominent position for transiting the junction safely within the main traffic stream.  An ASL will also help reduce the exposure of such cyclists at junctions with nearside (i.e. left in the UK and Ireland, right in USA, etc.) filter lights by providing a place for cyclists to wait while traffic passes on the inside.  A similar consideration arises where a free turn to the nearside is permitted (called right turn on red in the US).

At a red light, cyclists are more visible to motorists by being in front of them. At a green light, the green bike lane through the intersection reminds motorists and cyclists to watch for each other.

Safety aspects

Based on Danish research, it is argued that an ASL should have the general stop line 5 m back from the main traffic signal. The reasoning is that this puts cyclists clearly into the view of heavy goods vehicle (HGV) drivers, who have a large blind spot directly in front of the cab. According to an Organisation for Economic Co-operation and Development (OECD) review, ASLs are also advocated as way of improving pedestrian safety at crossings by increasing the separation between crossing pedestrians and waiting motor vehicles.

Although waiting cyclists might be safer out in front of HGVs, concerns have been expressed about nearside cycle lanes approaching such intersections may encourage cyclists to "creep up" on the inside of turning HGVs.  Collisions with turning HGVs are strongly associated with a high risk of death and serious injury. If the signal is green, cyclists are advised that the best way to minimize danger may be to stay within the main traffic stream.  If the lights change while the cyclist is still approaching, the advice is to negotiate their way back into the main traffic stream if possible.  Advice produced by the Royal Society for the Prevention of Accidents (RoSPA) regarding cyclists and lorries cautions cyclists that even though a junction has an ASL it may be better to wait if there is a lorry present.

Portland, Oregon, has implemented these "bike boxes" as they call them, and bicyclists have claimed them useful in aiding safety. The main goal is to prevent collisions between motorists turning right and cyclists going straight. Research performed by the Oregon Transportation Research and Education Consortium showed that motorists and cyclists alike appear to understand and comply with the boxes. Nearly three quarters of motorists stopped behind the bike box and roughly the same percentage of cyclists stopped at the proper location ahead of the motor vehicle stop bar. In addition, the number of conflicts at the intersections decreased and drivers yielded more to cyclists after the boxes were installed. User perceptions of safety also improved.

A leaflet produced by the UK Department for Transport notes:

References

External links

Do Advanced Stop Lines Work? London Cycling Campaign group evaluates ASL performance in Westminster, UK
New York City: "over 100 bike boxes at intersections citywide," as of October 2008.

Utility cycling
Road traffic management
Road junction types
Cycling safety

de:Radverkehrsanlage#Führung des Radverkehrs an Knotenpunkten